Marone is a town and comune in the province of Brescia, in Lombardy, Italy.

Marone may also refer to:

 Marone (surname), an Italian surname
 Marone family, a family in the CBS Daytime soap opera The Bold and the Beautiful
 Jackie Marone, a fictional character in the CBS soap opera The Bold and the Beautiful

See also 
 Marone Cinzano
 Maron (disambiguation)
 Maronea (disambiguation)
 Maroney (disambiguation)
 Marrone
 San Marone (disambiguation)